Ri In-mo (24 August 1917 - 16 June 2007) was an unconverted long-term prisoner who spent 40 years in prison and under the restriction of freedom in South Korea.

History 
Described by the Korean Central News Agency as "well-known among the DPRK people as an incarnation of faith and will" and "a pro-reunification patriotic fighter," Ri was born in 1917 in Kimhyonggwon County during the Japanese occupation of Korea. He was arrested by South Korea while fighting as a guerilla in Jirisan in January 1952 while serving as a war correspondent of the Korean Peoples Army during the Korean War. Ri served 34 years in prison in South Korea. During his incarceration, Ri was offered his freedom in exchange for signing a form renouncing his political beliefs but repeatedly refused.

Ri was released in 1988 but South Korean authorities continued to restrict his activities. He was repatriated to North Korea in March 1993 and was reunited with his wife and daughter. Following his repatriation, Ri was in ill health, apparently due to the conditions he experienced in prison. He underwent medical treatment in the United States in 1996. After his health improved, his suffering in prison was put into film by North Korea. Ri's numerous public appearances made him popular in the North.

Ri died on 16 June 2007 and was given a hero's funeral. His funeral committee was chaired by Kim Yong-nam with Choe Thae-bok as its vice-chairman and had 55 members including Kim Yong-il. A statue was erected in his honour in Pyongyang the following year.

Works

See also 

Unconverted long-term prisoners

References

Further reading 

1917 births
2007 deaths
Politics of North Korea
Politics of South Korea
North Korean activists
Propaganda in North Korea
War correspondents of the Korean War
North Korean people of the Korean War
Korean War prisoners of war